Petr (also Pyotr) Sergeevich Rykov (born December 30, 1981) is a Russian actor, television host, musical performer and model.

Biography 
Petr Rykov was born in Novgorod, Russian SFSR, Soviet Union (now Veliky Novgorod, Russia).

Soon after his birth, Rykov's family moved to Smolensk, where he spent his childhood. After graduating from high school, he attended the Mikhail Glinka School of Music for three years (1998-2001) and specialized in classical guitar. In 2001, Rykov changed his field of study to foreign languages at the Smolensk University of Liberal Arts. Later he moved to Moscow and continued his studies at the Moscow Humanities Institute named E.R Dashkova. He completed his career in 2006 with a diploma of a certified translator for English and German.

Between 2006 and 2010 Rykov has worked as a model for such fashion houses as Dolce & Gabbana, Armani, Neil Barrett, Esquire, Maison Bohemique and Henderson. In 2007 Rykov was a co-host of the talent contest STS sazhigaet superzwesdu (STS is looking for the superstar) at the Russian television channel STS.

From 2009 to 2010 Rykov completed a basic course at the Hermann Sidakov Drama School in Moscow. Afterwards he started studying acting at the Russian State Institute of Cinema (VGIK) and completed it successfully in 2014 as a professional actor (master class of Igor Nikolaevich Yasulovich).

Rykov is working at the Moscow Pushkin Drama Theatre as well as at the Moscow Tabakov Theatre. Currently he is involved in different films and television series produced in Russia and Ukraine.

In 2019 Rykov founded his own music band called Stone.

Theatre

Hermann Sidakov Drama School 

 A. Chekhov "The Seagull", drama (directed by N. Konykova) - Boris Alekseevitsh Trigor, author
 F. M. Dostoevsky "The Idiot" (monologue, directed by V. Lobacheva) - Rogozhin
 M. Bulgakov "The Days of the Turbins", drama play (directed by A. Nosatova and D. Barin) - Nikolai Turbin
 A. Chekhov "Ivanov", play (directed by S. Igolkina) - Yevgeny Konstantinovich Lvov, young country doctor

Moscow Pushkin Theatre 

 2012 - "La grande magia", play by Eduardo De Filippo, directed by E. Pisarev - supporting role
 2013 - "The Lady of the Camellias" Alexandre Dumas the Younger, direction and choreography by S. Zemlyansky - Baron de Varville Junior
 2013 - "Measure for Measure", comedy by W. Shakespeare, directed by Declan Donnellan - young nobleman Claudio
 2014 - "O. Henry Christmas stories", musical by P. Extroma, translation and direction by A. Frandetti - Jim
 2016 - "The House That Swift Built" by G. Gorin, directed by E. Pisarev - savant

Moscow Tabakov Theatre 

 2017 - "Stage Beauty", play by Jeffrey Hatcher (Complete Female Stage Beauty), directed by E. Pisarev - George Villiers, 2nd Duke of Buckingham

Selected filmography

Music videos

Awards and nominations 
 2011 - laureate of the festival "Saint Anna" for his performance in the short film Without words by I. Shakhnazarov.

References

External links 
 
 
 Petr Rykov on Moscow Pushkin Theatre
 Petr Rykov on Moscow Tabakov Theatre

1981 births
Living people
People from Veliky Novgorod
Russian male stage actors
Russian male film actors
Russian male television actors